The 2021 Manipur State League is the 14th season of the Manipur State League, the top-division football league in the Indian state of Manipur.The league began on 22 March 2021 and was postponed on 19 April 2021 due to Corona virus pandemic.

A total number of 17 teams participated in the league. Teams were divided into two groups A and B. The remaining matches were first postponed by the AMFA aminds the pandemic following the guidelines. All the remaining matches will be resumed in the first week of October.

Teams

Group A

Group B

Group stage

Group A

Group B

Knockout stage

Bracket

Quarter-finals

Semi-finals

Final

See also
2021–22 season in state football leagues of India
2021–22 Calcutta Premier Division
2021 Bihar State Soccer League

References

Manipur State League
2021–22 in Indian football leagues
2021–22 in Indian football